The France's 1983–1985 nuclear test series was a group of 25 nuclear tests conducted in 1983–1985. These tests followed the 1981–1982 French nuclear tests series and preceded the 1986–1988 French nuclear tests series.

References

French nuclear weapons testing
1983 in French Polynesia
1984 in France
1985 in France